Manuel de Herédia Caldeira Cabral (born 1968) is a Portuguese politician who served as Minister of Economy from 26 November 2015 to 15 October 2018. He served as an economic advisor in the Ministry Finance from 2009 to 2011. Cabral was elected to the Assembly of the Republic by the Braga constituency in 2015. He is first cousin of Isabel, Duchess of Braganza.

References

1968 births
Living people
Portuguese politicians
Economy ministers of Portugal
People from Lisbon